The masked finfoot or Asian finfoot (Heliopais personatus) is a highly endangered aquatic bird that was formerly distributed throughout the fresh and brackish wetlands of the eastern Indian subcontinent, Indochina, Malaysia and Indonesia. Like the rest of the family, the African finfoot and the sungrebe, the relationship to other birds is poorly understood.

Description
The masked finfoot is an underwater specialist with a long neck, a striking sharp beak, and lobed feet which are green. Both males and females have a black mask and eyebrow that contrasts with a white eyering and lateral cervical stripe. The rest of the neck is grey, the breast is pale and the back, wings, and tail are a rich brown. The males have an all-black chin while the females have a white chin.

Habits and range
The masked finfoot can be found in a range of habitats across the eastern Indian subcontinent through to Malaysia and Indonesia in a variety of fresh to brackish wetlands, although due to habitat destruction it has disappeared from most of this range. This range includes forest, wooded savannah, flooded forest, and even mangrove swamps.

The finfoot feeds on aquatic invertebrates, including both adults and larval mayflies, dragonflies, crustaceans, also snails, fish and amphibians. They are thought to be highly opportunistic and take some of their prey directly off the waters surface. They are adept out of water and will forage on the banks as well, unlike the grebes, which they resemble but are not related to.

Finfoots are not gregarious in habits and are usually seen singly or in pairs. They are very secretive. Even experienced ornithologists see them very rarely, making them a prized sighting for birders and twitchers. Because they are so elusive, it is not known if they spend most of their time in the water, where they are almost always seen, or on land.

The breeding biology is poorly known. It is thought to coincide with the rainy season. In Bangladesh, the breeding season was observed to extend from June to September. They build a pad-shaped nest of small sticks low above water. The nests are occasionally seen to have few long leaves, grass and reeds. Three to seven eggs are laid. The chicks are dark grey in colour with a white spot on the tip of the beak. The chicks are fed with fish and shrimps. The chicks leave the nest shortly after hatching.

Status and conservation
The masked finfoot was formerly considered endangered and declining with fragmented populations and fewer than 600-1,700 individuals in 2009, but a 2020 study in Forktail found the population to likely be between 100-300, far lower than the previous estimate. This likely indicates that the species should be updated to critically endangered on the IUCN Red List, and major steps towards its protection have to be taken to avoid it becoming Asia's next avian extinction. Definitive breeding populations are only known from 4 sites in Bangladesh and Cambodia, with potential breeding populations at 6 possible sites in Myanmar, Laos, and Vietnam; the species has likely been extirpated from Thailand, Malaysia, Indonesia, and Singapore. Major threats to the species are human disturbance and habitat loss in the low-lying forested wetlands that it inhabits. The bird is protected in Malaysia.

References

 Handbook of the Birds of the World, Volume Three, Hoatzin to Auks; de Hoyo, Elliot and Sargatal,

External links
'BirdLife Species Factsheet'

masked finfoot
Birds of Bangladesh
Birds of Northeast India
Birds of Myanmar
Birds of Cambodia
Birds of Vietnam
Birds of Indochina
masked finfoot
masked finfoot